Dr. Henning Mysager, mayor of Brovst municipality, Denmark representing Venstre from 1986 to 1998, served as the Vice-Chairman of the World Scout Committee.

In 1983, Mysager was awarded the 168th Bronze Wolf, the only distinction of the World Organization of the Scout Movement, awarded by the World Scout Committee for exceptional services to world Scouting.

References

External links

Recipients of the Bronze Wolf Award
Year of birth missing
Scouting and Guiding in Denmark
World Scout Committee members
People from Jammerbugt Municipality